Skibobbing (also called skibiking or snowbiking) is a winter sport involving a bicycle-type frame attached to skis instead of wheels and sometimes a set of foot skis. The use of foot skis is what defines "skibobbing".

Although skibobs are often called ski bikes or snow bikes, they are different, and the sport should also not be confused with snowbiking, which is the sport or recreation of bicycling on snow.

Type-1 skibobs have no suspension. Suspended designs are Type-2 'freestyle' skibobs.

History
Although the original idea for a bicycle with skis was patented as early as 1892, and skibobbing had been a form of transportation in the Alps, it was not until 1954 that the first international race was held. Seven years later, the FISB (Fédération Internationále de Skibob) was formed, which since 1967 has held an annual Skibobbing World Championship.

Originally, skibobbing was one of the very few methods by which  could alpine ski, but it soon became a popular sport amongst the physically able, too.

Gallery

See also
 Jack Jumping
 Sit-ski, used in Para-alpine skiing

References

Snow sports
Articles containing video clips